Polonje  is a village in Sveti Ivan Zelina municipality, Croatia. At the 2011 census its population was 344.

References

Populated places in Zagreb County